Wadala Cheema is a village located in the Gujranwala district in the province of Punjab, Pakistan.  It is situated on the bank of the river Chenab.  

Villages in Gujranwala District